The Staggs–Huffaker Building is a historic commercial building at North Main and West Illinois Streets in Beebe, Arkansas.  It is a two-story vernacular brick building, with an angled corner bay.  The Main Street facade has a wood-shingled awning extending across the first floor.  There is brick corbelling above the second level, and a gabled parapet above.  Built about 1880, it is one of a small number of commercial buildings to survive from the city's early railroad-related development.

The building was listed on the National Register of Historic Places in 1991.

See also
National Register of Historic Places listings in White County, Arkansas

References

Commercial buildings on the National Register of Historic Places in Arkansas
Buildings and structures in Beebe, Arkansas
National Register of Historic Places in White County, Arkansas
Commercial buildings completed in 1880
1880 establishments in Arkansas